Audrey Diwan (born 1980) is a French film director of Lebanese origin. Prior to becoming a film director she worked as a journalist and a screenwriter. She is a member of Collectif 50/50, a French NGO promoting equality between men and women in the film industry. In 2021 her film Happening won Golden Lion at 78th Venice International Film Festival.

Career
Her directorial debut film  premiered in 2019. 

Her 2021 film Happening was selected for the main competition at the 78th Venice International Film Festival, where it was subsequently awarded the Golden Lion, thus making her the sixth female director to ever win this award.

Filmography

Awards and nominations

References

External links
 

Living people
1980 births
French film directors
Directors of Golden Lion winners